Sohrab Sobhani (born February 15, 1960) is an Iranian-American author and lecturer on energy issues, U.S. immigration policies and U.S. policy toward the Middle East.

Formerly a professor at Georgetown University, Sobhani is currently the chairman and Chief Executive of Caspian Group, a company that specializes in working with companies that have business interests in the United States, the Middle East and the former Soviet Union. He is the founder and CEO of Sparo Corporation. Sobhani serves on the Board of Z Advanced Computing (ZAC). Sobhani has published one book on immigration: Press 2 for English: Fix Immigration, Save America, and two books on foreign affairs: King Abdullah of Saudi Arabia: A Leader of Consequence and The Pragmatic Entente: Israeli–Iranian Relations, 1948–1988.

Sobhani ran as an Independent candidate for the United States Senate in Maryland in 2012 against Republican nominee Daniel Bongino, Libertarian Dean Ahmad, and Democratic incumbent Ben Cardin. He received 16.4 percent of the vote, beating the state's all-time mark for an independent or third-party candidate. Senator Cardin was re-elected with 56% of the vote, with the Republican candidate capturing 26.3% of the total.

Early life and education
Born in Kansas, as a child Sobhani lived in Iran, his family's ancestral home. After 1979, his parents left Iran due to the Islamic Revolution and immigrated to the United States, where Sobhani had already begun his higher education. He earned first his bachelors and later his PhD in Political Economy at Georgetown University, where he later served as an adjunct professor in political economy. Sobhani is an usher at the St. Francis Episcopal Church in Potomac, is married and has two children, and has lived with them in Montgomery County for the last 33 years.

Career
Sobhani is CEO, chairman, and founder of Caspian Group holdings, LLC, (Caspian Group). The Caspian Group is a "multidisciplinary group of companies with broad international business interests in the fields of energy (including green renewables), infrastructure development, high technology, publishing and strategic advisory services".

In 2012, Sobhani, with the National Oil and Gas Authority, Petra Solar, and the Bahrain Petroleum Company, made an agreement to bring American-made "smart" solar technology to the township of Awali, the University of Bahrain, and other locations in Bahrain. "Smart solar is an innovative approach that couples solar with smart grid technology and is deployed in partnership with utility companies to generate clean, safe renewable energy while making the electric infrastructure more stable, efficient and energy-independent. This approach builds large-scale solar in a reliable fashion that avoids future costs of rebuilding the grid."

In 1990, the then-Soviet Union state Azerbaijan was negotiating with BP for its offshore oil exploration. Sobhani, an Azeri-speaking American, was sought out by Communist Party leader Ayaz Mutalibov, who decided to allow Amoco a chance to get the deal. In 1991, after Sobhani's talks with Mutalibov, Amoco was granted exclusive rights to the Azeri oil field for one year. Eventually, several companies took a share of the offshore exploration after the fall of the Soviet Union.

U.S. Senate campaigns
Prior to 2012, Sobhani made two runs for the United States Senate in Maryland as a Republican, losing both times in the primary: first in 1992 when he lost to Alan L. Keyes, and again in 2000 when he lost to Paul Rappaport.

In 2012, as an independent, Sobhani primarily ran on a platform of jobs and education. He pledged to accomplish these five goals:
 $3 billion investment in Maryland's roads and bridges through public-private partnerships.
 $1 billion in public-private partnerships to finance the reconstruction of residential homes within inner-city Baltimore. Through microloans pegged to areas of urban blight the plan seeks to support home ownership and the revitalization of communities.
 $500 million investment from global non-profit organizations to support cancer research and treatment in Maryland directed towards Johns Hopkins, University of Maryland and the National Institutes of Health.
 $150 million investment from global non-profit organizations to fund scholarships/internships for low-income students in Maryland.
 $1 billion in exports for Maryland-based companies by linking Maryland to export markets around the world.

Sobhani pledged to only run for two terms, not to run for a second term if he didn't accomplish his five goals, and reach out to both parties if they are willing.

Personal life
In a radio interview, Sobhani has stated that he has previously fund-raised for the Urban Alliance Foundation. The non-profit will receive according to his plan a $150 million investment from global non-profit organizations to fund scholarships/internships for low-income students in Maryland.

Contributions 
Sobhani has contributed as a pundit to the following:
 The Hill
 The Washington Times
 CNN
 The Christian Science Monitor
 Huffington Post
 The Baltimore Sun
 The Hoya
 Forbes

He has also made appearances for his campaign on the following shows:
 CBS Baltimore with Pat Warren
 WBAL (AM) with C4
 WYPR with Dan Rodricks
 America Tonight with Kate Delaney

References

External links
 

1960 births
American Episcopalians
American non-fiction writers
American politicians of Iranian descent
American political commentators
American writers of Iranian descent
Georgetown University alumni
Living people
Maryland Independents
Maryland Republicans